Stuart W. Bowen Jr. (born March 24, 1958), is an American lawyer who served as the Special Inspector General for Iraq Reconstruction (SIGIR) from October 2004 to October 2013. He previously served as the Inspector General for the Coalition Provisional Authority (CPA-IG), a position to which he was appointed in January 2004. Mr. Bowen's mission includes ensuring effective oversight of the $63 billion appropriated for Iraq's relief and reconstruction.

Background
Born in Washington, D.C., on March 24, 1958, Mr. Bowen attended the Episcopal High School in Alexandria, Virginia, earned a B.A. from the University of the South/Sewanee, attended Vanderbilt University Law School, and received a J.D. from St. Mary's University School of Law in San Antonio, where he served on the Law Journal's Editorial Board. He spent four years on active duty as an intelligence officer in the U.S. Air Force, earning the rank of Captain and the Air Force Commendation Medal.  From 1991 to 1992, Mr. Bowen was Briefing Attorney to Texas Supreme Court Justice Raul Gonzalez; and from 1992 to 1994, he was an Assistant Attorney General of Texas, with a litigation practice focused on the  civil prosecution of state licensee regulatory violations and appellate work in state and federal court.

From 1994 to 2000, Mr. Bowen held a variety of positions on Texas Governor George W. Bush's staff, including Deputy General Counsel, Deputy General Counsel for Litigation, and Assistant General Counsel. He was part of President Bush's legal team handling the post-election litigation in Florida during November–December 2000; his work helped ensure that overseas military ballots were properly counted. Mr. Bowen subsequently served as counsel to the Bush-Cheney transition team.

From 2001 to 2003, Mr. Bowen served President Bush as Deputy Assistant to the President and Deputy Staff Secretary and Special Assistant to the President and Associate Counsel. In 2003, he became a partner at the law firm of Patton Boggs LLP, working out of its Washington, D.C. office.

Special Inspector General for Iraq Reconstruction
As Special Inspector General for Iraq Reconstruction, Mr. Bowen is tasked with auditing and investigating the use of taxpayer funds appropriated for the Iraq reconstruction effort.  Since 2004, he has managed the production of 390 audits and inspections, producing financial benefits in excess of $1.5 billion; his investigations have yielded over 83 convictions, with recoveries in excess of $192 million via forfeiture orders, fines, and seizures.

Mr. Bowen has supervised the production of 35 quarterly reports to the Congress, travelled to Iraq 34 times, and testified before the Congress on 35 occasions.  He managed the compilation of seven lessons learned reports, including HARD LESSONS (Government Printing Office February 2009), a  book-length report on the entire Iraq reconstruction enterprise, which provides 13 recommendations for improving the US approach to overseas stabilization and reconstruction operations. All of these reports are available at the University of North Texas Libraries CyberCemetery archive of www.sigir.mil.

Mr. Bowen's work has earned a number of awards, including: The David Walker Excellence in Government Award for Performance and Accountability from the National Intergovernmental Audit Forum; Outstanding Inspector General's Report to Congress from the Council of Inspectors General for Integrity and Efficiency (CIGIE);Outstanding Investigative Task Force Award (CIGIE); Outstanding Inspection Report Award (CIGIE); Outstanding Investigative Case Accomplishment Award (CIGIE); Outstanding Audit Team Award from the President’s Council on Integrity and Efficiency (PCIE); Outstanding Inspection Team Award (PCIE); Gaston Gianni Special Award for Outstanding Inspector General’s Office (PCIE); Newsmaker of the Year Award from the Engineering News-Record; St. Thomas More Award for Distinguished Public Service from The St. Mary’s University School of Law/San Antonio; and a Best and Brightest Award from Esquire Magazine. Because of the nature of its subject matter, Mr. Bowen's work has required media engagement, including appearances on C-SPAN, NPR, PBS, CNN, CBS, NBC, ABC, FOX, CNBC, and BBC, as well as numerous interviews with international and local print journalists. Mr. Bowen's writings have appeared in a variety of  publications including The Fletcher Forum of World Affairs, National Defense University's Prism Quarterly, The Journal of International Peace Operations, and books published by King's College London and The National Defense University.

The SIGIR mission in Baghdad has not been without tragedy.  On March 24, 2008, a rocket impacted the Embassy grounds killing Paul Converse, a SIGIR auditor.  Paul was posthumously awarded the Jefferson Star by the State Department, its highest honor.  Five other SIGIR staff members have been wounded while serving in Iraq.

Texas Health and Human Services Commission Inspector General

In January 2015, Texas Governor Greg Abbott named Bowen as the Inspector General for the Texas Health and Human Services Commission.  The appointment is subject to Senate confirmation.

Brought in as an outsider to clean up a contracting scandal, Bowen also had to contend with hundreds of millions of questionable fraud allegations made by his predecessor.  By September he had settled cases totaling $9 million.  In addition, Bowen faced repairing ties with the Medicaid provider community and with HHSC.   As Inspector General, Bowen is charged with preventing, detecting, and deterring fraud, waste, and abuse in the Texas Health and Human Services System. 

On October 22, 2015, Bowen accused Planned Parenthood of misconduct and informed them all of the state's Planned Parenthood affiliates were being dropped as a Medicaid health care provider.  He cited videos showing misconduct and sent investigators with letters to Planned Parenthood offices in San Antonio, Dallas, and the Houston area, requesting records.   His letters cited the authority of Health and Human Services Commission to investigate allegations of potential fraud involving Medicaid payments.

Bowen was forced to resign by Gov. Greg Abbott on May 10, 2017, after the governor discovered Bowen had been moonlighting for Hyatt Farber Schreck, a lobbying firm that represents the Iraqi government.
Bowen said he had consulted with a state ethics advisor and was told that his moonlighting "fully complied" with the health commission's policy.  However, the health agency's policies explicitly bar employees from having an "economic or monetary interest in a lobbying firm".

References

External links

http://edition.cnn.com/2005/WORLD/meast/01/30/iraq.audit/
https://www.washingtonpost.com/wp-dyn/content/article/2005/05/04/AR2005050402256_pf.html Audit of Iraq Spending Spurs Criminal Probe, Washington Post, May 5, 2005
http://www.bloomberg.com/apps/news?pid=10000087&sid=anps9Ih6B6EE&refer=top_world_news U.S. Planned Poorly for Rebuilding Iraq, Inspector General Says, Bloomberg News, October 30, 2005
http://www.nytimes.com/2005/11/18/world/americas/18iht-fraud.html
https://www.washingtonpost.com/wp-dyn/content/article/2007/01/29/AR2007012901817.html
https://www.washingtonpost.com/wp-dyn/content/article/2006/08/31/AR2006083101162.html
http://www.stripes.com/news/another-report-faults-iraq-blunders-1.86247
http://www.nytimes.com/2009/11/21/world/middleeast/21reconstruct.html?pagewanted=all
https://www.washingtonpost.com/world/iraqi-security-forces-facing-serious-problems-us-oversight-official-reports/2011/01/30/ABzwy5Q_story.html
https://www.washingtonpost.com/world/marine-gets-6-years-in-prison-for-iraq-fraud/2011/02/07/ABr4SwQ_story.html
http://www.c-span.org/Events/House-Oversight-Cmte-Hearing-on-Troop-Withdrawal-from-Iraq/10737419967/

1958 births
Lawyers from Washington, D.C.
Living people
People from Washington, D.C.
Sewanee: The University of the South alumni
St. Mary's University School of Law alumni
Texas lawyers
United States Air Force officers
United States government people of the Iraq War
Vanderbilt University alumni